2013–14 Pirveli Liga  was the 25th season of the Georgian Pirveli Liga. The season began on 30 August 2013 and finished on 16 May 2014.

Format 

27 teams were divided into groups A and B for a single two-round competition. Group leaders and runners-up gained promotion to the top tier while five clubs of these groups were relegated to the third division.

Teams

Group A

Group B

League tables

A Group

B Group

References

External links
 Results, fixtures, tables at Soccerway

See also 
 2013–14 Umaglesi Liga
 2013–14 Georgian Cup

Erovnuli Liga 2 seasons
2013–14 in Georgian football
Georgia